Birmingham Duddeston was a constituency of the House of Commons of the Parliament of the United Kingdom from 1918 to 1950. It elected one Member of Parliament (MP) by the first-past-the-post system of election.

Boundaries 

The Representation of the People Act 1918 provided that the constituency was to consist of "Duddeston and Nechells Ward, St Mary's Ward (except the part thereof included in the Aston Division), and so much of the portion of Aston Ward which is not included in the Aston Division as lies to the west of the London and North Western Railway".

On its abolition by the Representation of the People Act 1948, the Duddeston and Nechells Wards became part of the Small Heath constituency, and the St Mary's and Aston wards were transferred in their entirety to the Aston constituency.

Members of Parliament

Election results

Election in the 1910s

Elections in the 1920s

Elections in the 1930s

Election in the 1940s

References 

Parliamentary constituencies in Birmingham, West Midlands (historic)
Constituencies of the Parliament of the United Kingdom established in 1918
Constituencies of the Parliament of the United Kingdom disestablished in 1950